Charyze Pagotan Solomon, better known by her screen name Chariz Solomon (born August 22, 1989), is a Filipino actress, model, comedienne, singer, and who is one of the hosts in the Philippine television program Startalk. She appears in several GMA Network programs. She also appeared in Unforgettable as the arrogant villain friend of Connie, Ruth and Pepito Manaloto as Janice Generoso, the hardworking supervisor of PM Mineral Water and a long suffering wife to Patrick Generoso.

Personal life

Born of a Filipina mother and a half German father, Chariz started doing commercials and television print ads at a young age because she wanted to help her family. She has twin brothers, Robert and Bobby Solomon who are also making their mark at the modeling and commercial industry and were former housemates of Pinoy Big Brother: All In as Fourth and Fifth Pagotan. She is cousin of beatboxer, singer and Akafellas' member, DJ Myke Solomon. In December 2012, she married businessman Nestor Ng and in November 2013, she gave birth to their first child.

Career
Chariz started her showbiz career when she joined in the reality-based Artista search in the Philippines, StarStruck: The Next Level, but she failed to join the final 14. Despite this, she appeared on several GMA Network shows like Zaido: Pulis Pangkalawakan, My Only Love, and the latest, Babangon Ako't Dudurugin Kita. She appeared on My Best Friend's Girlfriend.

Filmography

Television

Film

Awards and nominations

References

External links

Profile on iGMA.tv
https://www.gmanetwork.com/sparkle/artists/charizsolomon

1989 births
Living people
Filipino child actresses
Filipino women comedians
Filipino film actresses
Filipino television actresses
Participants in Philippine reality television series
StarStruck (Philippine TV series) participants
GMA Network personalities
Tagalog people
People from Manila
Filipino people of German descent